Jacob Eugene Latz (born April 8, 1996) is an American professional baseball pitcher in the Texas Rangers organization. He made his Major League Baseball (MLB) debut in 2021.

Amateur career
Latz attended Lemont High School in Lemont, Illinois. Latz pitched to a 10–0 record with a 0.23 ERA and 114 strikeouts over  innings his senior season of high school and was named the 2014 Illinois Player of the Year. He was drafted by the Toronto Blue Jays in the 11th round of the 2014 MLB draft, but turned down a $1 million signing bonus and attended Louisiana State University to play college baseball. Latz was given a medical redshirt due to a stress reaction in his left elbow that caused him to miss the 2015 season. He played for the DuPage County Hounds of the Midwest Collegiate League in 2015. In  innings for the Tigers in 2016, he went 0–1 with a 7.56 ERA. Latz transferred to Kent State University for the 2017 season and was forced to sit out the season due to transfer rules. He was drafted the Texas Rangers in the 5th round of the 2017 MLB draft, and signed with them for a $386,100 signing bonus.

Professional career
Latz made his professional debut in 2017 with the AZL Rangers of the Rookie-level Arizona League, going 0–1 with a 6.75 ERA over just  innings. He played for the Spokane Indians of the Class A Short Season Northwest League in 2018, going 6–3 with a 3.13 ERA and 67 strikeouts over 71 innings. Latz split the 2019 season between the Hickory Crawdads of the Class A South Atlantic League and the Down East Wood Ducks of the Class A-Advanced Carolina League, going a combined 7–1 with 1.62 ERA and 74 strikeouts over 61 innings. Due to the cancelation of the 2020 minor league season due to the COVID-19 pandemic, Latz joined the Sugar Land Skeeters of the independent Constellation Energy League. Over  innings for Sugar Land, Latz posted a 2–1 record with a 4.35 ERA and 15 strikeouts. He was assigned to the Rangers alternate training site in September 2020. He split the 2021 minor league season between the Frisco RoughRiders of the Double-A Central and the  Round Rock Express of the Triple-A West, going a combined 2–2 with a 4.30 ERA and 119 strikeouts over  innings.

On August 25, Texas selected his contact to the active roster and promoted him to the major leagues to make his MLB debut that night against the Cleveland Indians. Due to 2021 MLB COVID outbreak rules, his addition to the 40-man roster was temporary. In his debut, he threw  innings while striking out 4 and suffering the loss. He was returned to Round Rock and removed from the 40-man roster on August 30. Latz spent the 2022 season back with Round Rock, going 5–5 with a 5.77 ERA, and 59 strikeouts over 53 innings.

References

External links

Kent State Golden Flashes bio
LSU Tigers bio

1996 births
Living people
People from Lemont, Illinois
Baseball players from Illinois
Major League Baseball pitchers
Texas Rangers players
LSU Tigers baseball players
Arizona League Rangers players
Spokane Indians players
Hickory Crawdads players
Down East Wood Ducks players
Sugar Land Skeeters players
Frisco RoughRiders players
Round Rock Express players